Rudolph Lewis may refer to:

 Rudolph Lewis (bass-baritone) (1844–1917), Gilbert and Sullivan bass-baritone
 Rudolph Lewis (cyclist) (1887–1933), South African road racing cyclist